Florencia is a municipality and capital city of the Department of Caquetá, Colombia. It is the most populous city in southwest Colombia. It lies on the Orteguaza River which flows into the Caqueta River.  Its population is 168,346 in 2018.

Etymology 
The name of the city pays homage to an Italian businessman dedicated to the rubber trade, Paolo Ricci, from the city of Florence.

History
The area where Florencia is located was inhabited by tribes of the Andaquí ethnic group. The territory where the city is located was also inhabited by Witoto and  tribes. In 1542, the territory was explored for the first time by the Spanish conquistador, Hernán Pérez de Quesada. Florencia was founded on December 25, 1902 by Capuchin Friar Doroteo De Pupiales (1876-1959) Born in Pupiales, Nariño, Colombia. The city became an important site after the creation of the trail between the settlement and the town of Guadalupe in what is now the department of Huila.

Geography
Florencia is located at the foot of the Cordillera Oriental mountain range. The municipality of Florencia limits to the north with the Huila Department and the municipality of El Paujil, to the east with the municipalities of El Paujil and La Montañita, to the south with the municipalities of Milán and Morelia, and to the west with the municipality of Belén de Andaquies and the Huila Department.

Climate
Florencia has a tropical rainforest climate (Köppen Af), and experiences significant rainfall during the course of the year. There is still a large amount of rainfall, even in the driest month. In Florencia, January is the driest month, while June tends to be the wettest month. About  of rain falls annually during the year.

Economy 
According to a report of the first half of 2022 by the MinCIT, the main economic activities of the city were Trade and repair of vehicles with 22.6%, followed by Public Administration and Defense with 18.8% and third, Artistic Activities with 10.9%.

Heritage Sites 

 El Encanto Petroglyphs: These petroglyphs are located to the left of the Hacha River near Barrio Torasso. The engravings are approximately 16 meters long. They were first described by archaeologist Eliécer Silva Celis in 1963. Among the petroglyphs are Zoomorphic and Human figures.
 Curiplaya Building: A historic building of colonial architecture built in the 1950s.  This building served as a hotel, currently it houses some cultural entities of the municipality and the department. In addition it is the headquarters of the Palace of Culture and Fine Arts of the Amazon (Spanish: Palacio de la Cultura y Bellas Artes de la Amazonía). The building was declared a national cultural property in 2000 by the Colombian Ministry of Culture. The name "Curiplaya" means "Golden Beach" in the Witoto language.

See also
 Our Lady of Lourdes Cathedral, Florencia
 Gustavo Artunduaga Paredes Airport

References

External links

  Alcaldía Municipal de Florencia en Caquetá 
  Florencia official website
  Government of Caqueta; Florencia
 Portal Positivo del Caquetá
 Clasificados del Caquetá

 
Municipalities of Caquetá Department
Capitals of Colombian departments